Livingstone College, established 1893 is a former college for Christian missionaries in Leyton, London, England.  It was named after the Scottish physician and missionary David Livingstone. Its purpose was to provide education to missionaries going to tropical countries in the elements of medicine. Training was given over a 9-month programme.

The site of the college, postcode E10 6SJ is now occupied by a street named Greg Close.

References

Further education colleges in England
David Livingstone
Leyton
Christian education in the United Kingdom
1893 establishments in the United Kingdom
Defunct hospitals in London